Severo Cea (fl. 1913–1935) was a Filipino politician who was Municipal President of Tigaon in 1913, a congressman from 1931 to 1934 and a member of the 
1934 Constitutional Convention.

References

Year of birth missing
Year of death missing
Mayors of places in Camarines Sur
Members of the House of Representatives of the Philippines from Camarines Sur
Members of the Philippine Legislature